Sand Hollow State Park is a state park located in Utah, USA, featuring a  reservoir and an extensive off highway vehicle recreation area on Sand Mountain.  The park is near the town of Hurricane.

The park was officially dedicated in April 2003 and surrounds the Sand Hollow Reservoir.  Sand Hollow quickly became a popular site for camping, fishing, boating, and ATV riding on nearby sand dunes.

References

External links 
 Sand Hollow State Park

Protected areas established in 2003
State parks of Utah
Protected areas of Washington County, Utah